State Route 146 (SR 146) is a  state highway that exists entirely within Jackson County in the northeastern part of the U.S. state of Alabama. The western terminus of the highway is at an intersection with SR 65 in Swaim, an unincorporated community. The eastern terminus of the highway is at an intersection with SR 79 between Skyline and Hytop.

Route description
SR 146 begins at an intersection with SR 65 in Swaim. It travels to the south-southeast and almost immediately intersects the southern terminus of Jackson County Route 9 (CR 9). It curves to the southeast and crosses over Paint Rock River. Right after the river are intersections with the southern terminus of Jackson CR 516 and the eastern terminus of Jackson CR 142 in quick succession. The highway proceeds to climb over 1000 feet in the course of two miles. The highway curves to the east and travels just south of Baileytown. After an intersection with Jackson CR 138, the highway curves to the northeast and crosses over Guess Creek. It curves to the east-southeast and intersects the northern terminus of Jackson CR 544 on the northwestern edge of Sanders Cemetery. It travels along the northern edge of the cemetery, crossing Mill Creek. Approximately  later, SR 146 intersects the eastern terminus of Jackson CR 545. It then meets its eastern terminus, an intersection with SR 79. Here, the roadway continues as Jackson CR 107.

Major intersections

See also

References

146
Transportation in Jackson County, Alabama